Chris Collins is an American television writer and producer. He has worked on the HBO dramas The Sopranos and The Wire. He was an executive story editor for the Starz drama series Crash. He is a producer and writer for the FX series Sons of Anarchy.

Biography
Collins joined the crew of The Wire in 2004 as a script coordinator for the third season. He continued to serve as a script coordinator and became a staff writer for the fourth season in 2006 . Collins and the writing staff won the Writers Guild of America (WGA) Award for Best Dramatic Series at the February 2008 ceremony for their work on the fourth season. Collins became a story editor for the fifth season in 2009. Collins was involved in the writer's planning meetings for the fifth season. He wrote the teleplay for the third episode of the fifth season "Not for Attribution" from a story he co-wrote with show runner and executive producer David Simon. Collins and the writing staff were nominated for the WGA award for Best Dramatic Series again at the February 2009 ceremony for their work on the fifth season but Mad Men won the award.

In 2009 Collins became an executive story editor and writer for new Starz drama series Crash. Showrunner Glen Mazzara handpicked the writing staff for the series and selected people with a background of writing edgier material. Collins was hired because of his work on The Wire. The series followed an ensemble cast in racially tense Los Angeles and was based on the film of the same name. Collins co-wrote the episode "The Doctor Is In" with co-executive producer Frank Renzulli and wrote the episode "Los Muertos". Mazzara, Collins and the majority of the writing staff left the series at the end of the first season.

Collins was hired as a co-producer and writer for the second season of FX crime drama Sons of Anarchy in fall 2009. Sons of Anarchy showrunner and executive producer Kurt Sutter had previously worked with Mazzara on The Shield. The series focuses on a motorcycle gang. Collins wrote the episode "Smite" and co-wrote the episode "Gilead" with Sutter.

Collins was promoted to producer for the series third season in 2010. He wrote the episode "Caregiver", co-wrote the episode "The Push" with Julie Bush, co-wrote the teleplay for the episode "Turas" with Brady Dahl based on a story by Sutter and wrote the teleplay for the season's penultimate episode "June Wedding" based on a story by Sutter. Collins was promoted to supervising producer for the fourth season in 2011. Collins co-wrote the season's second episode "Booster" with co-executive producer Dave Erickson and the sixth episode "With an X" with co-producer Regina Corrado.

Filmography
Production staff

Writer

Awards

References

External links

Living people
Place of birth missing (living people)
Year of birth missing (living people)
American male screenwriters
American television writers
American male television writers
Writers Guild of America Award winners